Qazi (also known as Gazī and Ghāẕī) is a city in Samalqan District, Maneh and Samalqan County, North Khorasan Province, Iran. At the 2006 census, its population was 2,370, in 674 families.

References 

Populated places in Maneh and Samalqan County

Cities in North Khorasan Province